The 1990 Allegheny Gators football team was an American football team that represented Allegheny College in the North Coast Athletic Conference (NCAC) during the 1990 NCAA Division III football season. The Gators compiled a 13–0–1 record, outscored opponents by a total of 442 to 171, and won the NCAC and NCAA Division III championships.

Led by first-year head coach Ken O'Keefe, the Gators struggled in the opening game, playing  to a 30–30 tie.

Ten Allegheny players received first-team honors on the 1990 All-NCAC honors. Quarterback Jeff Filkovski, linebacker Darren Hadlock, center John Marzka, and defensive back Tony Bifulco received All-America honors.

The team played its home games at Robertson Stadium/Frank B. Fuhrer Field in Meadville, Pennsylvania.

Schedule

Personnel

Players

 Mike Adams, WR	6-1	180	Fr.	Altoona, Pa. / Altoona Area
 Andy Barkley	FB	6-0	223	Fr.	Northfolk, Mass. / King Phillip
 73	Delmar Becker	OG	6-3	242	Sr.	Mars, Pa. / Mars
 62	Ron Bendekovic	OT	6-0	271	So.	Monaca, Pa. / Center
 Gabe Bender	QB	6-0	170	Fr.	Oklahoma City, Okla. / Heritage Hall
 29	Tony Bifulco	CB	5-9	180	Jr.	Cheektowaga, N.Y. / West Seneca East
 13	Todd Boledovic	QB	6-3	180	So.	Brook Park, Ohio / Berea
 4	Steve Boucher	PK	5-10	170	Sr.	Lake City, Pa. / Girard
 74	Fletcher Brooks	DT	6-5	240	So.	Simsbury, Conn. / Westminster School
 	Eugene Calhoun	DB	5-8	160	Fr.	Cleveland, Ohio / St. Joseph’s
 19	Ben Cammarano	QB	6-3	200	Jr.	West Seneca, N.Y. / South Park
 80	Jim Carroll	SE	6-2	197	Jr.	Fortsmouth, R.I. / Worcester Academy
 	Ken Clarke	 	 	 	Fr.	Winnetka, Ill.
 39	Mike Collitt	LB	6-1	215	Jr.	Middlebury, Vt. / Union
 36	Sean Cox	FB	5-10	200	So.	Ashtabula, Oho / Ashtabula
 59	Tom Cvelbar	OG	6-1	230	So.	Euclid, Ohio / St. Joseph’s
 96	Jeff Damico	LB	5-10	205	Sr.	Williamsville, N.Y. / Clarence Central
 61	Joe DeBonis	OG	6-3	190	So.	Poultney, Vt. / Poultney
 	Brad DeiCas	QB	6-0	205	Fr.	Charleroi, Pa. / Charleroi
 	Mike Deluca	TB	5-11	175	Fr.	Rochester, N.Y. / Brighton
 28	Matt Doheny	FS	5-10	173	Jr.	Alexandria Bay, N.Y. / Alexandria Central
 	Craig Donghia	FB	5-9	190	Fr.	New Castle, Pa. / Mohawk
 	Damon Dosch	DB	6-0	175	Fr.	Kittaning, Pa. / Kittaning
 20	Stan Drayton	TB	5-9	170	So.	Cleveland, Ohio / John Marshall
 21	Terrence Driscoll	SS	5-10	175	Sr.	Gillette, N.J. / White Hills Regional
  	Brant Dubovick	DL	6-2	225	Fr.	Cutchoga, N.Y. / Mattituck
 34	Jason Dvorsak	DT	6-1	230	So.	Avella, Pa. / Avella
 69	Kurt Eimiller	DT	5-11	198	So.	Bemus Point, N.Y. / Jamestown
 16	Nathan Elia	CB	5-7	171	So.	Milford, Mass. / Worcester Academy
 18	Mark Ellermeyer	LB	5-11	180	Jr.	Butler, Pa. / North Hills
 12	Jeff Filkovski	QB	6-1	185	Sr.	Penn, Pa. / Penn-Trafford
 	Ed Foster	WR	5-11	175	Fr.	Glens Falla, N.Y. / Mt. Herman (Mass.)
 	Tim Freshly	WR	5-10	155	Fr.	Alliance, Ohio / Marlington
 99	Jeff Gamble	DL	6-2	232	Jr.	Leechburg, Pa. / Leechburg
 	Rob Gardner	WR	5-10	170	Fr.	Euclid, Ohio / St. Joseph’s
 	Charles Feiselhart	DE	6-0	185	Fr.	Pittsburgh, Pa. / Northgate
 38	Jordan Geist	RB	5-10	203	Sr.	East Falmouth, Mass. / Falmouth
 78	Ed Gerber	OT	6-2	265	Jr.	New Brighton, Pa. / New Brighton
 41	Darren Hadlock	LB	5-11	200	Jr.	Plainfield, N.H. / Lebanon
 93	Brian Haibach	DE	6-1	200	So.	Saegertown, Pa. / Saegertown
 91	Scott Hardy	FL	5-11	150	So.	Pittsburgh, Pa. / North Catholic
 98	Bill Henderson	DE	6-2	205	So.	Chagrin Falls, Ohio / Chagrin Falls
 	Steve Hay	QB	5-11	180	Fr.	Somerset, Pa. / Somerset
 	David Horn	 	 	 	So.	Pittsburgh, Pa.
 	Robert Horrocks	LB	6-0	190	Fr.	Willoughby, Ohio / South
 44	Chris Howard	TE	6-0	200	Jr.	McKeesport, Pa. / McKeesport Area
 	Greg Hrebinko	FB	6-0	180	Jr.	Pittsburgh, Pa. / Chartiers Valley
 47	Darren Hudson	FL	5-11	150	So.	Cleveland, Ohio / John Marshall
 27	Curtis Island	DB	5-9	174	Jr.	Trumbull, Conn. / Trumbull
 	Jamie Jones	OL	6-4	310	Fr.	Nitro, W. Va. / Nitro
 11	Brian Kane	CB	5-10	180	Sr.	Painesville, Ohio / Lake Catholic
 	Todd Kahm	TE	6-5	200	Fr.	Dunkirk, Ohio / Dunkirk
 14	Mike Kitchen	SS	5-8	176	So.	Euclid, Ohio / Euclid
 	Israel Klinger	DB	5-10	170	Fr.	Knox, Pa. / Keystone
 77	Craig Kuhn	OT	6-4	276	Jr.	Waterford, Pa. / Fort LeBoeuf
 35	David LaCarte*	FS	6-2	190	Sr.	Charleroi, Pa. / Charleroi
 	Joe LaCarte	DE	6-2	190	Fr.	Charleroi, Pa. / Charleroi
 24	Julia Lacayo	FL	5-10	165	Jr.	Annandale, Va. / Annandale
 94	Sean Lattimore	PK/P	6-0	190	So.	Blawnox, Pa. / Fox Chapel
 67	Adam Lechman	C	6-2	209	Jr.	Chagrin Falls, Ohio / Chagrin Falls
 92	Paul Lockwood	DT	6-3	225	Jr.	Mountain Lakes, N.J. / Mountain Lakes
 76	Paul Lynch	C	6-2	205	So.	Belgrade Lakes, Maine / Showhegan
 43	Wayne Mack	LB	6-0	190	So.	Berea, Ohio / Berea
 23	Eric Marohn	FB	5-7	182	So.	Clarendon Hills, Ill. / Hinsdale Central
 64	John Marzka*	C	6-0	220	Sr.	Erie, Pa. / Erie Academy
 	Ed Maynard	QB	6-0	170	Fr.	Smethport, Pa. / Smethport
 75	T.J. McCarthy	OT	6-2	256	Sr.	Lowell, Mass. / Lowell
 	Kevin McDowell	QB	6-0	185	Fr.	Bethel Park, Pa. / Bethel Park
 65	Steve Menosky	OG	6-1	225	Sr.	Erie, Pa. / Erie Academy
 26	Bill Miller	RB	5-7	165	So.	Oil City, Pa. / Oil City
 	Craig Murowsky	DL	6-1	220	Fr.	Euclid, Ohio / Euclid
 	Chris Nelson	QB	6-3	185	Fr.	Williamstown, W. Va. / Williamstown
 	James Nesmith	 	 	 	Fr.	Painesville, Ohio
 	Paris Nocera	DE	6-0	188	Fr.	Edinburg, Pa. / Mohawk
 40	Jerry O’Brien	TB	6-1	185	Sr.	Pittsburgh, Pa. / North Catholic
 	Matt Ohnemus	WR	6-0	180	Fr.	Waltham, Mass. / Worcester Academy
 49	David Pape	LB	5-11	191	Sr.	Edinburg, Pa. / Mohawk
 88	Derek Paxton	DT	6-1	248	Sr.	Cleveland Heights, Ohio / Shaw
 70	Jeff Pearson	NG	6-1	230	Jr.	Titusville, Pa. / Titusville
 	Scott Paschke	TE	6-4	160	Fr.	Chardon, Ohio / Newbury
 	Joe Pass	PK	5-11	165	Fr.	Coraopolis, Pa. / Moon
 	Mark Fellis	DE	6-3	205	Fr.	Greensburg, Pa. / Salem
 83	John Ploeger	DE	6-2	190	Jr.	Pittsburgh, Pa. / Shady Side
 42	Max Potter	LB	5-10	180	So.	Philadelphia, Pa. / St. Joe’s Prep
 31	Craig Rankin	FS	5-9	160	So.	Avella, Pa. / Avella
 	Kevin Rauch	QB	6-1	180	Fr.	Hermitage, Pa. / Hickory
 82	Kurt Reiser	TE	6-2	225	So.	Butler, Pa. / Knoch
 	Matt Ronca	QB	5-11	180	Fr.	York, Maine / York
 	Trevor Rusert	DB	5-10	175	Fr.	Hamburg, N.Y / Hamburg
 6	Mike Ryan	FS	5-9	151	So.	Cleveland, Ohio / Cleveland Heights
 	Victor Samra	 	 	 	Fr.	Bronxville, N.Y.
 	Ron Saunders	DT	6-1	218	Sr.	Grove City, Pa. / Grove City
 87	Frank Scarvel	Fl	5-11	168	So.	Farrell, Pa. / Darrell
 85	Mark Schreiber	SE	5-9	178	So.	St. Marys, Pa. / St. Marys
 	Garth Selong	WR	6-2	187	Fr.	Middleburg Heights, Ohio / Midpark
 	Sean Shannon	TB	5-7	160	Fr.	Sewickly, Pa. / Quaker Valley
 30	Dale Shaw	SS	5-8	171	Sr.	Tarentum, Pa. / Highlands
 7	Jay Smartz	CB	5-11	192	Jr.	Sharpsville, Pa. / Sharpsville
 32	Doug Smith	FB	5-10	185	Sr.	Turnersville, N.J. / Washington Township
 8	Jeff Snyder	SS	5-11	175	So.	Meadville, Pa. / Meadville
 	Mark Spoerke	WR	6-1	185	Fr.	Parma Heights, Ohio / Valley Forge
 53	John Stagnari	OT	6-1	220	So.	Andover, N.J. / Peddie School
 	Jack Stokes	TB	5-7	190	Fr.	Belmont, Mass. / St. Sebastians
 46	David Ufnar	DE	6-0	209	Jr.	Liverpool, N.Y. / Liverpool
 66	Rob VanFosson	OG	6-0	240	Jr.	Massillon, Ohio / Jackson
 	Martin Vaughn	DB	6-0	170	Fr.	Elizabeth, Pa. / Elizabeth Forward
 	Greg Ward	PK	5-11	165	Fr.	Bethel Park, Pa. / Bethel Park
 	Eric Watters	TB	5-6	152	Fr.	Girard, Pa. / Girard
 10	Robert White	CB	5-9	152	So.	Rye, N.Y. / Rye
 5	Peter Yoars	QB	6-0	189	So.	South Salem, N.Y. / Peddie School
 84	John Yock	DE	6-1	205	Jr.	Cairnbrook, Pa. / Shade
 81	Craig Zarzeczny	TE	6-2	225	Jr.	Harborcreek, Pa. / Harbor Creek

Coaching staff
 Head coach: Ken O’Keefe (first year)
 Assistant coaches: 
 Bob Fraser (defensive ends, special teams)
 Andy Hoffman (graduate assistant, defensive line)
 Jack Leipheimer (defensive backs, defensive coordinator)
 Joe Philbin (offensive line, offensive coordinator)
 Brian Swain (graduate assistant, receivers)
 Kevin Wells (graduate assistant, linebackers)
 Ernest Wilson (graduate assistant, offensive backs)

References

Allegheny
Allegheny Gators football seasons
NCAA Division III Football Champions
College football undefeated seasons
Allegheny Gators football